Hamer or Hamer-Banna (Hamer: hámar aapó) is a language within the South Omotic branch of the Afroasiatic language family. It is spoken primarily in southern Ethiopia by the Hamar people, Banna people, and by speakers of Karo.

There is a pidginized variety in local use.

Phonology

Consonants 

Hamer has six places of articulation for consonants, and eleven manners of articulation, though the system is not entirely orthogonal.

/p/ may optionally be realized as [ɸ] in any position, except as /pp/ and /mp/, in which cases it is always realized as [p]. Several phonemes have special intervocalic or prevocalic realizations:

/VbV/: [β]
/Vka/: [x]
/#qa/: [qʼ]
/#qo, #qu/: [ʔ]
/VɓV/: [b], [β]
/VɗV/: [d], [ʔ]
/#tʼa, #tʼi/: [ʦʼ]
/VtʃʼV/: [tʃ]

/n/ assimilates to a following velar (i.e., as [ŋ]).

Consonant length is distinctive non-initially. Long /ɾ/ is realized as a trilled /r/.

Vowels 

There are five basic vowels

The vowels are further subdivided into two main categories (with a third being a surface "umlaut" phenomenon (see below)). Category I vowels are shorter, pharyngealized, and have retracted tongue root. Category II vowels are longer, glottalized, and have advanced tongue root.

Vowel Harmony exists in that every root word and every suffix belongs to either category I or II. When the category of a root and its suffix do not agree, a kind of umlauting takes place. An umlauted vowel retains its basic place of articulation, and is pronounced between the corresponding category I and II vowels, i.e. of medium length, and unmarked for pharyngealization, glottalization or tongue root position. Generally, the vowel(s) of the suffix undergo umlauting, but there is a set of "strong" suffixes which retain their category, and cause the vowels of the root to undergo umlauting.

There is a sixth non-phonemic vowel, /ə/, which appears in speech epenthetically to "break up" otherwise invalid consonant clusters. There is no need to consider this a phoneme, and no definitive reason for it to require a grapheme, as it occurs entirely predictably as part of what is essentially an allophonic process.

Syllable and word structure 

Syllable structure is simply (C)V(C), though syllable-final consonants are rare. Strings of at least three vowels are documented. Strings of more than two consonants are not documented. There are a large number of (mostly very simple) rules governing metathesis and epenthesis when consonant clusters appear. In summary, there are three sorts of consonant cluster: "valid", "special", and "invalid". Valid clusters undergo no change between their underlying and surface forms. Special clusters undergo some kind of (generally metathetic) transformation in their surface forms. Invalid clusters insert a non-phonemic /ə/ between the two consonants to create their surface forms.

Orthography 

There is no official writing system for Hamer, though several romanization schemes have been proposed, along with a Gə'əz orthography. As yet, there is no movement for official recognition of any of these systems.

"Lydall" romanization 

This is the romanization used by Jean Lydall. It is perhaps the de facto standard, simply by being the one in which the majority of the existing corpus is presented.

Consonants

Category I vowels

Category II vowels

Umlauted vowels 

Vowels which have been umlauted are written using the letter for their original sound, combined with an underline.

No marking of stress occurs.

Gə'əz orthography 

Letters are provided below with their traditional Amharic names. Rows marked in dark red have special meanings that cannot fully be explained in the table: the ʾÄlf row is used for Category II vowels without a preceding consonant, while the ʿÄyn row is used for Category I vowels without a preceding consonant.

Morphology

Nouns
Nouns do not have inherent gender or number, but may be inflected masculine, feminine, and plural, all three of which are contrastive (that is, a noun cannot be inflected for both a gender and for plurality). While these inflections are not obligatory, they trigger agreement on adjectives and verbs. The inflection markers are:

The forms beginning with "t" may only be attached directly to the root, and are usually used with animate nouns. The other forms may be attached to the root or to the stem.

For inanimate nouns, marked masculinity is usually diminutive, while marked femininity is augmentative. E.g., a clay pot is dáa. Daatâ (masculine) signifies a small clay pot, while dáano (feminine) is a large clay pot. Cross-linguistically, the use of masculine as diminutive is unusual, as is free gender inflection.

Notes

References 
 Lydall, Jean (1976): "Hamer" in: Bender, M. Lionel (ed.): The Non-Semitic Languages of Ethiopia. East Lansing: African Studies Center, Michigan State University. pp. 393–438.
 Lydall, Jean (1988): Gender, Number and Size in Hamar. in: Bechhaus-Gerst, Marianne and Fritz Serzisko (eds.): Cushitic-Omotic: Papers from the International Symposium on Cushitic and Omotic Languages, Cologne, January 6–7, 1986. Hamburg. pp 77–90.
 Lydall, Jean (2005): Hamär dialect cluster. in: Uhlig, Siegbert (ed.): Encyclopaedia Aethiopica, Vol. 2. Wiesbaden. pp 981–982.

External links
 World Atlas of Language Structures information on Hamer
 Rosetta Project: Hamer-Banna Swadesh List

Languages of Ethiopia
Aroid languages